Galium tunetanum, the Tunisian bedstraw, is a species of plants in the Rubiaceae. It is native to Tunisia, Algeria, Morocco, Spain (Málaga Province), and the island of Sicily.

References

External links
Flora Vascular, Flora Iberica, Galium tunetanum

tunetanum
Flora of Tunisia
Flora of Morocco
Flora of Algeria
Flora of Spain
Flora of Italy
Flora of Sicily
Plants described in 1788